Uran is a city in India. 
Uran also means uranium or Uranus in several languages. 

It may refer to:

Places
Uran Togoo - Tulga Uul Natural Monument, Mongolia

India
Uran taluka, Maharashtra
Nerul–Uran line (Mumbai Suburban Railway) 
Uran (Vidhan Sabha constituency)
Uran City railway station 
Uran Gas Turbine Power Station, Uran city

People
Uran (name)
Rigoberto Urán Urán, a Colombian professional road racing cyclist
Uran (character), the Astro Boy character

Military
Kh-35 Uran, anti-ship missile
Uran-9, a Russian tracked unmanned combat ground vehicle

Other
URAN, Ukrainian Radio Interferometer of the National Academy of Sciences of Ukraine
Uran Khatola, a fictional flying vehicle in the traditional folktales of North India and Pakistan
Uran Khatola (film), a 1955 Hindi film

See also

 Uranium (disambiguation)
 Uranus (disambiguation)